This is a list in alphabetical order of cricketers who have played for Cambridge University Cricket Club (CUCC) in top-class matches since the club was first recorded in 1817. CUCC teams have always had important or first-class cricket status. In 1972 and 1974 the team also played official List A cricket matches.

Some CUCC players have been members of teams representing combinations of British Universities or, since 2001, the Cambridge University Centre of Cricketing Excellence (CUCCE), later rebranded the Cambridge MCCU. This team includes students from Anglia Ruskin University, as well as Cambridge University, and plays in some first-class matches. After the establishment of the Cambridge UCCE, the annual three-day first-class University Match against Oxford University Cricket Club was replaced by a one-day match against Oxford at Lord's and a four-day first-class match against Oxford, alternating between Fenner's and The University Parks. The 2020 fixture was the last match with first-class status, although the fixture is still played under first class conditions. This list of players includes only those players who have represented CUCC itself in first-class matches.  Players who have represented the Cambridge UCCE and MCCU In first-class matches can be found in List of Cambridge UCCE & MCCU players.

The details are the player's usual name followed by the years in which he was active as a CUCC player and then his name is given as it would appear on modern match scorecards. Note that many players represented other first-class teams besides CUCC. Players are shown to the end of the 2020 season.

A

B

C

D

E

F

G

H

I
 Iftikhar Bukhari (1957) : Iftikhar Bukhari
 Alan Imlay (1906–1907) : A. D. Imlay
 Imraan Mohammad (1997–1999) : Imraan Mohammad
 Reggie Ingle (1924–1926) : R. A. Ingle
 Charles Ingram (1854–1859) : C. P. Ingram
 Doug Insole (1947–1949) : D. J. Insole
 John Frederick Ireland (1908–1911) : J. F. Ireland
 Leonard Irvine (1926–1928) : L. G. Irvine
 Izhan Khan (2014) : Izhan Khan

J

K

L

M

N

O

P

Q
 David Quinney (1971) : D. H. Quinney

R

S

T

U
 John Urquhart (1948) : J. R. Urquhart

V
 Bryan Valentine (1928–1929) : B. H. Valentine
 Carl van Geyzel (1924) : C. T. van Geyzel
 David Varey (1981–1983) : D. W. Varey
 Richard Vaughan (1928) : R. T. Vaughan
 Thomas Verghese (1987) : T. M. Verghese
 Henry Vernon (1850–1852) : H. Vernon
 Niel Viljoen (1991) : J. N. Viljoen
 Harold Vincent (1914) : H. G. Vincent
 James Vitali (2019-2020) : J. C. Vitali

W

Y
 Norman Yardley (1935–1938) : N. W. D. Yardley
 William Yardley (1869–1872) : W. Yardley
 Joseph Yates (1866) : J. M. Yates
 Kenneth Yates (1961) : K. C. Yates
 Michael Yeabsley (1995) : M. I. Yeabsley
 Goodwin Young (1873) : G. Young
 Dick Young (1905–1908) : R. A. Young

References

Players

Cambridge University
Cricket